Julien Péridier (1882 – April 19, 1967) was a French electrical engineer and amateur astronomer. For his work he was made an Officer of the Legion of Honour. In 1933 he founded a private observatory at Le Houga (Gers), France. After his death, his library and instruments were acquired by the McDonald Observatory at the University of Texas for use in teaching astronomy.

The double  refracting telescope at Le Houga was used extensively for studies of the planets and the teaching of young astronomers.
 
In 1959 his observatory was part of an observational campaign regarding an occultation of Regulus by Venus. The team of Harvard observers at Le Houga was led by Gérard de Vaucouleurs, who had previously collaborated with Mr. Péridier on studies at the observatory.  The success of the 1959 work started a five-year collaboration with NASA on photometry of the Moon and planets using a  reflector.

He was married to Adrienne Blanc-Péridier, who was an accomplished author of one-act plays, romantic novels, and biographies.

A crater on Mars is named in his honor.

External links

Obituaries
by G. de Vaucouleurs (at University of Texas website)
PASP 79 (1967) 379

1882 births
1967 deaths
20th-century French astronomers
20th-century French engineers
French electrical engineers